Nanda Deepa is a 1963 Indian Kannada-language romantic drama film, directed by M. R. Vittal, making his first venture in film direction. The film was produced and written by actor Vadiraj and co-produced by Jawahar for Sri Bharathi Chitra studio house in its debut production. The film stars Rajkumar and Harini, along with Leelavathi and Udaykumar playing other pivotal roles.

The film, upon release garnered wide appreciation and recognition and won the prestigious National Film Award for Best Feature Film in Kannada at the 10th National Film Awards. The movie was remade in Gujarati in 1964 as Ramat Ramade Ram - making this the first Kannada movie to be remade in that language. The movie starred Tarla Mehta and Mahesh Kumar in the lead role with popular actor Sanjeev Kumar reprising the role of Udaykumar. While the Kannada version won the National Award, the Gujarati version won eight State awards.

Cast 
 Rajkumar as Shankar
 Udaykumar as Ravi
 Harini 
 Leelavathi 
 K. S. Ashwath
 Sorat Ashwath
 Narasimharaju
 Vadiraj
 Ganapathi Bhat
 Hanumanthachar
 Balakrishna in a guest appearance

Soundtrack 
The music was composed by M. Venkataraju, with lyrics by Sorat Ashwath. All the songs composed for the film were received extremely well and considered as evergreen songs.

Awards
 10th National Film Awards

 Certificate of Merit for Best Feature Film

References

External links 
 

1963 films
1960s Kannada-language films
1963 romantic drama films
Indian romantic drama films
Indian black-and-white films
Films scored by M. Venkataraju
Best Kannada Feature Film National Film Award winners
1963 directorial debut films
Films directed by M. R. Vittal
Kannada films remade in other languages